Amphipyra molybdea is a moth in the family Noctuidae. It is found from southern Russia, south to Turkey.

External links
Fauna Europaea

Amphipyrinae
Moths of Asia
Moths described in 1867